Kang is a village in Kgalagadi District of Botswana. It is situated in the Kalahari Desert and lies on the Trans-Kalahari Highway between Ghanzi in the north and Sekoma in the south. Kang also provides access to the Kgalagadi Transfrontier Park in the south-west and the Central Kalahari Game Reserve in the north-east. The route via Ghanzi takes one to the Namibian border, whilst that to Sekoma leads to Gaborone, the capital of Botswana. The population was 5,985 according to the 2011 census.
Kang also falls under the Kgalagadi North constituency whose Member of Parliament is Hon. Talita Monnakgotla. The village is divided into seven wards which are; Gasekgalo, Gamonyemana (main ward), Gamotshoto, Gapanyana, Gamoriti, Kaatshwene and Tshwaragano ward. The village is led by a female chief, Kgosi Basadi Seipone who is the daughter to the late former chief Churchill Pego Seipone who died in 2010. The village's key development areas include the Central Roads Depot, Central Transport Organisation (with a fuel point), Airstrip/Landing ground (along Kang-Tsetseng road), mini Rural Administration Centre/ Service Centre, Botswana Open University Regional Campus, Brigade Centre, Police Station, Health Clinic, Magistrate Court, Department Road Transport Service offices, Wildlife offices, Botswana Power Corporation Offices, Water Utilities Corporation offices, Facility Management offices, Senior Secondary, Junior Secondary School and two primary schools.

The private sector has also had their fair share of developments in the village. Kang is also home to Bank Gaborone, Choppies superstore, Sefalana Cash and Carry, Kang Ultra Stop, Nkisi Lodge, Nakabu Hotel, Echo Lodge, Yame-Kele Guesthouse, Kang Lodge, Goo Baitshepi Guest house, Kang VDC Guesthouse, Kang Meat Market and Abattoir, PEP Stores, Shoprite and Lavender Pharmacy.

The village being at the centre of the constituency and along one of the busiest roads (Trans Kalahari Highway) is one of the fastest growing villages and a great place for investments.

References

Kgalagadi District
Villages in Botswana